Hengevelde (or Wegdam) is a village in the eastern Netherlands. It is located in the municipality of Hof van Twente. Until 2011 it was in Ambt Delden.

History 
It was first mentioned in 1188 as Hengheuelde, and means "field on the hill". It was also referred to as Wegdam. In 1806, a church was built, and the village started to develop. In 1840, it was home to 355 people.

Notable people 
 Mike te Wierik, footballer

Gallery

References 

Populated places in Overijssel
Hof van Twente